The 8th Golden Eagle Awards were held June to November 1, 1990, in Nanjing, Jiangsu province.  Nominees and winners are listed below, winners are in bold.

Best Television Series
This award was not presented.
Hedge, Women and Dog /篱笆·女人和狗
Shanghai Morning/上海的早晨
Overseas Eternal Regret/海外遗恨

Best Lead Actor in a Television Series
Yan Xiang for Shanghai Morning

Best Lead Actress in a Television Series
Zhou Jie for Overseas Eternal Regret

Best Supporting Actor in a Television Series
Qi Mengshi for Shanghai Morning

Best Supporting Actress in a Television Series
Li Yuanyuan for Shanghai Morning

References

External links

1990
1990 in Chinese television
Mass media in Nanjing